Marco Mancini was the second-highest-ranking officer of SISMI, the military intelligence agency of Italy  until his 5 July 2006 arrest for his participation in the kidnapping of Hassan Mustafa Osama Nasr (the Imam Rapito case). He was then indicted a second time on December 13, 2006, for his role in the SISMI-Telecom scandal. On February 12, 2013, he was sentenced to a 9-year jail term by the Milano Court of Appeals.

Careery synopsis 
Mancini previously led the anti-terrorist division of the Italian secret service. Mancini was arrested, as well as his superior, General , on July 5, 2006.

The investigations directed by Milan's public prosecutor, have demonstrated that Mancini proposed himself to the CIA as a "double agent."  According to Colonel Stefano D'Ambrosio's testimony to the Italian justice, the CIA refused because they considered him too "venal."   But his demand "left traces in the computer" of the US intelligence.

All SISMI testimonies concur in saying that Mancini owed his dazzling career (he was a non-commissioned officer) to his "privileged relations with the CIA."  According to SISMI testimony, after the 17 February 2003 kidnapping of the Hassan Mustafa Nasr, then CIA director George Tenet sent a letter to SISMI General Nicolò Pollari in August 2003, to which he would owe, according to SISMI testimony, the real reasons of his promotion.

Further reading 
 Allesandro Mantovani, reporter at Il Manifesto, "Du riffifi dans les services secrets, L'Humanité, August 12, 2006

References 

SISMI